Ab Sardan may refer to:
 Ab Sardan-e Olya Jowkar
 Ab Sardan-e Sofla Jowkar
 Ab Sardan-e Tal Deraz